Hungarian Swimming Association (MÚSZ) is the governing body of swimming association in Hungary. It is a non-profit organization that was founded in 1907 on a meeting at the Hungarian Olympic Committee.

It is affiliated to:

FINA, the International Swimming Federation
LEN, the European Swimming League
MOB, the Hungarian Olympic Committee

International events hosted
World Championships:
 2017 World Aquatics Championships – Budapest, 14–30 July
 2022 World Aquatics Championships – Budapest, June 18 – July 3

European Championships:
 1926 European Aquatics Championships – Budapest, 18–22 August
 1958 European Aquatics Championships – Budapest, 31 August – 6 September
 2006 European Aquatics Championships – Budapest, 26 July – 6 August
 2012 European Aquatics Championships (Swimming) – Debrecen, 21–27 May
 2007 European Short Course Swimming Championships – Debrecen, 10–13 December
 Swimming at the 2017 European Youth Summer Olympic Festival – Győr
 2005 European Junior Swimming Championships – Budapest, 14–17 July
 2016 European Junior Swimming Championships – Hódmezővásárhely, 6–10 July

International achievements

Olympic Games

World Championships
 including Hungarian national water polo teams results

European Championships
 including Hungarian national water polo teams results

Presidents

National records 
MÚSZ maintains the Hungarian records in swimming.

See also
Hungarian Swimming Championships

External links 
Magyar Úszó Szövetség (official website)

Hungary
Swimming
Swimming in Hungary
Swimming organizations
1907 establishments in Hungary
Sports organizations established in 1907